Renita J. Weems (born June 26, 1954) is an ordained minister, a Hebrew Bible scholar, and an author. in  1989 she received a Ph.D. in Old Testament/Hebrew Bible studies from Princeton Theological Seminary making her the first African American woman to earn a Ph.D. in the field. Her work in womanist biblical interpretation is frequently cited in feminist theology and womanist theology. She is credited with developing theology and ethics as a field.

Education 
Weems earned her undergraduate degree from Wellesley College, and earned her Master's in 1983 and Ph.D. in 1989  from Princeton Theological Seminary. She was the first African American woman to earn a Ph.D. in Old Testament Studies.  Weems' doctoral dissertation "Sexual Violence as an Image for Divine Retribution in Prophetic Writings" was a trailblazing effort. Writing in an era when women doctoral students hesitated to take on “women’s issue” topics, and when most male faculty still felt uncertain, if not uncomfortable, advising such topics, Weems chose to study marriage imagery in the Hebrew prophets focusing largely on the books of Jeremiah, Ezekiel and Hosea. Her work offered careful, challenging, and often painful insights into use of this metaphor; moving beyond traditional scholarship, which had all too easily looked only at the “love” side of the marriage metaphor. Drawing on an interdisciplinary methodology of literary criticism, gender criticism, and sociological and ideological analyses Weems was among the first to point to the violence associated with this biblical imagery, violence acceptable within the prophets’ cultural assumptions about marriage, and all too often considered acceptable even in twentieth-century America. Her 1995 volume Battered Love: Marriage, Sex, and Violence in the Hebrew Prophets brought this important work to a wide audience, with powerful hermeneutical reflection on implications for contemporary understandings of God and of marriage.

Career 
Weems is the first African American woman to earn a Ph.D. in Hebrew Bible.

Weems taught on the faculty the Divinity School at Vanderbilt University in Nashville, TN (1987-2003). She served as the 2003-2005 William and Camille Cosby Professor of Humanities at Spelman College in Atlanta, Ga. She was Vice President, Academic Dean, and Professor of Biblical Studies at American Baptist College in Tennessee, ending her time in 2017.

Weems was ordained an elder in the African Methodist Episcopal Church in 1984.

Honors 
Dr. Weems is featured in “Black Stars: African American Religious Leaders” (2008), a collection of biographies of some of the most important Black Religious Leaders over the last 200 hundred years, including such impressive figures as Adam Clayton Powell, Elijah Muhammad, Sojourner Truth, Howard Thurman, and Dr. Martin Luther King Jr.

Her 1999 book, Listening for God: A Minister's Journey Through Silence and Doubt (Simon & Schuster), won the Religious Communicators' Council's prestigious 1999 Wilbur Award for "excellence in communicating spiritual values to the secular media."

She was the first African-American woman to deliver the Lyman Beecher Lecture at Yale University (2008).

Publications 
 Showing Mary : how women can share prayers, wisdom, and the blessings of God (1st trade ed.). West Bloomfield, Mich.: Walk Worthy Press. . OCLC 61722833.
 Just a sister away : understanding the timeless connection between women of today and women in the Bible (1st Warner Books ed.). New York: Warner Books. . OCLC 60596133.
 I asked for intimacy : stories of blessings, betrayals, and birthings. San Diego, Calif.: LuraMedia. . OCLC 28148479.
 Battered love : marriage, sex, and violence in the Hebrew prophets. Minneapolis: Fortress Press. . OCLC 33333933.
 (Co-authored with CeCe Winans) On a positive note : her joyous faith, her life in music, and her everyday blessings. Weems, Renita J., 1954-. New York: Pocket Books. . OCLC 45144960
 "Song of Songs" in The new interpreter's Bible. Old Testament survey. Nashville: Abingdon Press. 2005. . OCLC 62330657.
 "Jeremiah" in Global Bible commentary. Patte, Daniel., Okure, Teresa. Nashville: Abingdon Press. 2004. . OCLC 55955180.
 What matters most : ten lessons in living passionately from the Song of Solomon. West Bloomfield, MI: Walk Worthy Press. . OCLC 53315250.
 Listening for God: A Minister's Journey through Silence and Doubt. New York: Simon & Schuster. 1999  OCLC 1020247830.

References 

Living people
African-American biblical scholars
African-American theologians
African-American Christians
American women academics
Female biblical scholars
Feminist biblical scholars
Old Testament scholars
Womanist theologians
1954 births
21st-century African-American people
21st-century African-American women
20th-century African-American people
20th-century African-American women